This was the first edition of the tournament.

Anna-Lena Grönefeld and Nicole Melichar won the title after defeating Klaudia Jans-Ignacik and Anastasia Rodionova 6–1, 6–3 in the final.

Seeds

Draw

References
 Main Draw

San Antonio Open - Women's Doubles
San Antonio Open
2016 in sports in Texas